Lion Rock is a  mountain summit located along the Great Western Divide of the Sierra Nevada mountain range, in Tulare County of northern California. It is situated in Sequoia National Park, one mile northeast of Mount Stewart, and one mile southwest of Triple Divide Peak. Lion Rock ranks as the 311th highest summit in California.

History
This mountain's name was officially adopted in 1928 by the United States Board on Geographic Names to commemorate the killing of a mountain lion near this location by Mansell Brooks, a sheep rancher, in 1883. The first ascent of the summit was made in 1927 by Dave Winkley, William Curlett, and Earl S. Wallace.

Climate
According to the Köppen climate classification system, Lion Rock is located in an alpine climate zone. Most weather fronts originate in the Pacific Ocean, and travel east toward the Sierra Nevada mountains. As fronts approach, they are forced upward by the peaks, causing them to drop their moisture in the form of rain or snowfall onto the range (orographic lift). Precipitation runoff from the mountain drains west into Lone Pine Creek which is a tributary of Middle Fork Kaweah River, and southeast to headwaters of Big Arroyo, which is a tributary of the Kern River.

See also

 List of mountain peaks of California

References

External links

 Weather forecast: National Weather Service

Mountains of Tulare County, California
Mountains of Sequoia National Park
North American 3000 m summits
Mountains of Northern California
Sierra Nevada (United States)